Cane Ridge is a ridge in southeastern Stoddard County in the U.S. state of Missouri.

Cane Ridge was so named on account of canebrake in the area.

References

Landforms of Stoddard County, Missouri
Ridges of Missouri